Jakub "Kuba" Giermaziak (born 9 July 1990 in Gostyń, Poland) is a Polish racing driver.

Racing record

Career summary

Complete Porsche Supercup results
(key) (Races in bold indicate pole position) (Races in italics indicate fastest lap)

Complete Formula 3 Euro Series results
(key)

Complete 24 Hours of Le Mans results

References

External links
  
 
 

1990 births
Living people
People from Gostyń
Sportspeople from Greater Poland Voivodeship
Polish racing drivers
Formula Renault Eurocup drivers
Formula Renault 2.0 NEC drivers
Portuguese Formula Renault 2.0 drivers
Formula 3 Euro Series drivers
Porsche Supercup drivers
24 Hours of Daytona drivers
24 Hours of Le Mans drivers
Rolex Sports Car Series drivers
American Le Mans Series drivers
European Le Mans Series drivers
ADAC GT Masters drivers
WeatherTech SportsCar Championship drivers
Motopark Academy drivers
Abt Sportsline drivers
Walter Lechner Racing drivers
Greaves Motorsport drivers
Phoenix Racing drivers
Nürburgring 24 Hours drivers